This is a list of Belgian television related events from 2016.

Events
8 January - 14-year-old Jens Dolleslagers wins the second season of The Voice Kids.
17 January - Laura Tesoro is selected to represent Belgium at the 2016 Eurovision Song Contest with her song "What's the Pressure". She is selected to be the fifty-eighth Belgian Eurovision entry during Eurosong held at the AED Studios in Lint.
2 June - Lola Obasuyi wins the fourth season of The Voice van Vlaanderen.

Debuts

Television shows

1990s
Samson en Gert (1990–present)
Familie (1991–present)
Thuis (1995–present)

2000s
Mega Mindy (2006–present)

2010s
ROX (2011–present)
The Voice van Vlaanderen (2011–present)
Belgium's Got Talent (2012–present)

Ending this year

Births

Deaths

See also
2016 in Belgium